The 1959 Arizona Wildcats football team represented the University of Arizona in the Border Conference during the 1959 NCAA University Division football season.  In their first season under head coach Jim LaRue, the Wildcats compiled a 4–6 record (2–1 against Border opponents) and were outscored by their opponents, 211 to 118. The team captains were Gary Cropper and Jim Geist.  The team played its home games in Arizona Stadium in Tucson, Arizona.

The team's statistical leaders included Eddie Wilson with 476 passing yards, Warren Livingston with 380 rushing yards, and Willie Peete with 173 receiving yards.

Schedule

References

Arizona
Arizona Wildcats football seasons
Arizona Wildcats football